Societa Industrie Elettroniche (SIEL) was an Italian company that made electronic organs and synthesizers in the 1980s.

Timeline of major products 

 1979 - Orchestra (Divide down oscillator network for full poly. Brass/string/key/organ.  ARP relabelled it the "Quartet" in the US as they were folding.)  
 1980 - Mono (A fairly nice sounding simple 1 DCO, 1 VCF monosynth)
 1981 - Cruise (Combination of “Mono“ and “Orchestra“ in one Synthesizer
 1982 - OR400 / Orchestra 2 (Improvement of Orchestra above. More parameter sliders.  This was also marketed by Sequential Circuits as the Prelude.) 
 1984 - Opera 6 (2 DCO divide down from HFO ssm2031 chips, with all analog signal/EG)
 1984 - DK600 (Opera 6 with different artwork. The last EPROM supports MIDI channels/Omni off) 
 1984 - Expander (opera 6/DK600 in a table top module.  Only dco B tune, Volume, master tune.)
 1985 - DK80 (splittable/layerable dual 6 voice synth with one M112B1 tone and one SSM2045 VCF per half.)
 1985 - Expander 80 (DK80 module)
 1985 - DK70 (One half of DK80 utilizing 8DCO in either single or 2DCO/4 voice.) This was also marketed by Giannini as GS 7010
 1985 - CMK 49 (Commodore 64 keyboard)
 
 1986 - DK700 (Enhanced DK600 with digital editing instead of knobs.)

See also

 List of Italian Companies

External links
Siel Synthesizers Website Information and photos of synthesizers

Musical instrument manufacturing companies of Italy
Electronic organ manufacturing companies
Synthesizer manufacturing companies of Italy
Electronics companies established in 1976
Italian companies established in 1976
Italian brands
Companies based in le Marche
Electronics companies disestablished in 1986
1986 disestablishments in Italy